Sinamaica is the seat of Páez Municipality, in Zulia State, Venezuela.  It is a village of about 2,000 people.

Populated places in Zulia